Hat Yai Junction is an international railway junction and a Class 1 railway station for the State Railway of Thailand in the center of Hat Yai City, Songkhla Province, Thailand. The station yard is the location of a large locomotive depot: Hat Yai Depot, the southernmost railway depot in Thailand.

Hat Yai Junction encouraged Hat Yai's economic boom and growth, making the city larger than the province's capital Songkhla.

History

The original station was known as U-Taphao Junction and was located to the north of the current station. The U-Taphao station also served as a junction for the Hat Yai–Songkhla Line. However, the junction often got hit by floods and was moved to the present location at Hat Yai Junction. U-Tapao was reduced to a halt and eventually closed. In 1978, the line from Hat Yai to Songkhla City closed down, leaving the junction to be only for the mainline to Sungai-Kolok and the branch to Butterworth.

Since the start of 2013, there have been plans to rebuild the line back to Songkhla City.

Services
There are 24 trains serving Hat Yai Junction daily, 12 each way. All types of trains must stop at this station. The trains are of the following:

 Thaksinarat Express 31/32 Krung Thep Aphiwat – Hat Yai Junction – Krung Thep Aphiwat
 Thaksin Express 37/38 Krung Thep Aphiwat – Sungai Kolok – Krung Thep Aphiwat
 International Express 45/46 Krung Thep Aphiwat – Padang Besar – Krung Thep Aphiwat
 Special Express 41/42 Krung Thep Aphiwat – Yala – Krung Thep Aphiwat (suspended due to COVID-19 pandemic)
 Rapid 169/170 Krung Thep Aphiwat – Yala – Krung Thep Aphiwat 
 Rapid 171/172 Krung Thep Aphiwat – Sungai Kolok – Krung Thep Aphiwat 
 Rapid 175/176 Hat Yai – Sungai Kolok – Hat Yai
 Local 445/446 Chumphon – Hat Yai – Chumphon
 Local 447/448 Surat Thani – Sungai Kolok – Surat Thani
 Local 451/452 Nakhon Sri Thammarat – Sungai Kolok – Nakhon Sri Thammarat
 Local 455/456 Nakhon Sri Thammarat – Yala – Nakhon Sri Thammarat
 Local 463/464 Phatthalung – Sungai Kolok – Phathalung
 Eastern and Oriental Express 974/975 Bangkok – Singapore – Bangkok
 Special Cross-Border Service 947/948, 949/950 Hat Yai Junction – Padang Besar – Hat Yai Junction
 KTM Intercity Ekspres Sawadee 991/992 KL Sentral – Hat Yai Junction – KL Sentral (seasonal only)

The station also previously served the following routes:
 Local ??? Hat Yai Junction – Songkhla (ceased 1978)
 Local ??? Songkhla – Hat Yai Junction (ceased 1978)
 International Express 35 Bangkok – Butterworth (ceased 2016)
 International Express 36 Butterworth – Bangkok (ceased 2016)

Terrorist attacks
Hat Yai Junction has been a target of the "Land Separation Movement" (South Thailand insurgency).

 29 June 1977 - Bomb, 14 injured
 7 August 1977 - Bomb on Hat Yai–Bangkok Train
 1989 - 2 Bombs, 7 dead
 7 May 2001 - Bomb, 4 dead including a 5-year-old boy.

Pop culture
Hat Yai Junction railway station is the setting of at least 2 Thai pops, including (RTGS: sanya jai) 'Love Promise') by  Narathip Kanchanawat of Chatree band, it has been popular since 1980, with new recordings by many performers, and Thai protest song (phleng phuea chiwit), titled (RTGS: kam sanya thi hat yai) 'Promise at Hat Yai') by Jew Khonkhianphleng in 1994.

References

Buildings and structures in Songkhla province
Railway stations in Thailand
Railway stations opened in 1924